Fuentidueña de Tajo is a municipality of the autonomous community of Madrid, central Spain. It belongs to the comarca of Las Vegas.

It was one of the settings for the 1937 movie The Spanish Earth.

Main sights
Torre del Reloj
Torre de los Piquillos, one of the remains of the ancient Castle of Santiago
Church of St. Andrew the Apostle, built has a chapel in 1175 and later expanded with a nave and two aisles. Its current appearance dates to the 17th century.

References

External links

Municipalities in the Community of Madrid